Pilosella echioides is a species of flowering plant belonging to the family Asteraceae.

Its native range is Europe to Central Siberia and Himalaya.

References

echioides